Robert Lee "Skipp" Sudduth IV (born August 23, 1956) is an American theater, film and television actor. He is perhaps best known for his role in the 1998 film Ronin and his lead in the TV drama Third Watch.

Early life and education
Born in Wareham, Massachusetts, the son of an engineer and a nurse, Sudduth attended George Washington High School in Danville, Virginia. Sudduth then earned a Bachelor of Science degree in biology from Hampden–Sydney College. He is the older brother of actor Kohl Sudduth. Sudduth received his Masters of Fine Arts degree in acting from the University of Virginia in 1985.

Career
Sudduth worked for a year as director of alumni relations at his alma mater in the administration of the college's then-new president Josiah Bunting III, author of The Lionheads and future commandant of Virginia Military Institute in Lexington. Sudduth then worked for a year as apprentice to the winemaker with poet and vintner Tom O'Grady at Rose Bower Vineyard and Winery. During this period, Sudduth was acting in community and campus theater and writing original comedy and directing and producing the annual comedy review, Parting Shots, at Hampden–Sydney College.

The following year, Sudduth returned to school entering the acting program in the Department of Drama at the University of Virginia. At UVA, he met and worked with Spencer Golub, who would go on to head the Drama Department at Brown University. Golub's emphasis on physically liberating the imagination through extensive guided improvisation became the foundation for Sudduth's approach to acting. Sudduth acted extensively during his time at UVA playing leading roles in Anton Chekhov's The Cherry Orchard, Sam Shepard's Curse of the Starving Class (opposite Nip/Tuck'''s Dylan Walsh), and Peter Shaffer's Equus, which featured the first full male and female nudity ever allowed on stage in a production at UVA.

Sudduth moved to Chicago in December 1985 aspiring to work with the Steppenwolf Theatre Company. During his four and a half years in Chicago, Sudduth played in many stage productions including Samuel Beckett's Waiting for Godot, Emily Mann's Execution of Justice, and Nebraska (by screenwriter John Logan, who penned The Aviator). He has appeared in stage adaptations of The Grapes of Wrath, On the Waterfront and A Clockwork Orange, and acted in the 1999 Broadway production of The Iceman Cometh (alongside Kevin Spacey) and the 2003 debut performance of Woody Allen's play Riverside Drive (starring with Paul Reiser). He also appeared in Twelfth Night at Lincoln Center (with Helen Hunt).

Sudduth's movie career has seen him play numerous small parts in 54 (1998), A Cool, Dry Place (1998), and Spike Lee's Clockers (1995), as well larger roles with Robert De Niro in Ronin (1998) and Flawless (1999). Sudduth, who is a keen amateur racing/stunt driver, performed nearly all of the driving his character does in Ronin.

Skipp Sudduth had a recurring role in the TV soap opera One Life to Live, but is better known for his portrayal of NYPD officer John "Sully" Sullivan in the NBC drama Third Watch. Sudduth appeared in all six seasons of the show and his character is one of the leading ensemble of eight around whom the underlying story arc revolves. He earned his Directors Guild of America card directing the episode "Collateral Damage, Part II" in season four. Sudduth has also made guest appearances in Homicide: Life on the Street, Law & Order, Oz, Trinity, Cosby, and Mad About You.

Sudduth is also a singer-songwriter. His acoustic-rock band Minus Ted has released three albums: Hope and Damage (1994), Really Really (1999) and Hope and Damage Revisited (2005). The last two are available on iTunes. He was a member of New York's Rumble in the Redroom comedy troupe (1996–99) and has recorded several notable audio books including one short story in the acclaimed Stephen King collection, Just After Sunset and Peter Canellos's biography of Ted Kennedy, Last Lion: The Fall and Rise of Ted Kennedy, both for Simon & Schuster.

In 2008, Sudduth created the role of Captain George Brackett in the Tony Award-winning revival of Rodgers and Hammerstein's South Pacific at Lincoln Center. Sudduth finished the year appearing in the New York premiere of Prayer for My Enemy, a play by Craig Lucas. The play was the second time Sudduth worked with director Bartlett Sher who had also directed South Pacific. The production ran at the off-Broadway theater Playwright's Horizons from November 14 to December 21 and also featured Victoria Clark, Michele Pawk, and Jonathan Groff. In the play, Sudduth played a recovering alcoholic coping with his son's return from the Iraq War.

Sudduth officially began his career as a director during his years in the cast of Third Watch by directing one episode in each of the last three years of the series. Since then, Sudduth has directed episodes of ER, Criminal Minds, Women's Murder Club, CSI: Cyber, and multiple episodes of CSI: NY. In 2012, he starred on the short-lived police drama NYC 22'' as NYPD Detective Tommy Luster.

Filmography

Film

Television

References

External links

Biography Club biography of Skipp Sudduth 
Third Watch cast biography 
Playwrights Horizons

1956 births
Male actors from Massachusetts
American male film actors
American male stage actors
American male television actors
American television directors
Hampden–Sydney College alumni
Living people
People from Wareham, Massachusetts